Prolyl 4-hydroxylase, transmembrane is a protein that in humans is encoded by the P4HTM gene.

Function

The product of this gene belongs to the family of prolyl 4-hydroxylases. This protein is a prolyl hydroxylase that may be involved in the degradation of hypoxia-inducible transcription factors under normoxia. It plays a role in adaptation to hypoxia and may be related to cellular oxygen sensing. Alternatively spliced variants encoding different isoforms have been identified.

References

Further reading